We're Here to Help is a 2007 Kafkaesque comedy film written and directed by Jonothan Cullinane and starring Erik Thomson, Miriama Smith, and Michael Hurst. It was produced by South Pacific Pictures.

Plot 
Based on a true story, Dave Henderson was audited 27 times from 1992 to 1995 after claiming a GST refund, and the Inland Revenue Department demanded he pay $NZ924,341.07 in taxes and penalties. He was charged with fraud, his business failed and he was bankrupted and had to sell his house. The IRD eventually conceded that he did not owe it $NZ924,341.07, and fraud charges against him were dropped. They also admitted that they owed him $NZ64,000.

Cast

References

External links

 
 

New Zealand comedy films
2007 comedy films
2007 films
2000s English-language films